William Proby may refer to:
 William Proby, 5th Earl of Carysfort (1836–1909), British peer
 William Proby, Lord Proby (1779–1804), British Royal Navy officer and politician
 William Proby (died 1739), father of English politician John Proby